"That's Entertainment" is a 1980 song by British punk-mod revivalist group the Jam from their fifth album, Sound Affects.

Although never released as a domestic single in the UK during the band's lifetime, "That's Entertainment" nonetheless charted as an import single (backed by a live version of "Down in the Tube Station at Midnight"), peaking at No. 21. It was given its first full UK release in 1983 and peaked at No. 60. A second reissue in 1991 also made the top 50.

The song remains one of the two all-time biggest selling import singles in the UK, alongside the Jam's "Just Who Is the 5 O'Clock Hero?", which hit the charts at No. 8 as an import in 1982.

"That's Entertainment" has been listed by BBC Radio 2 as the 43rd best song ever released by any artist.

Song profile
"That's Entertainment" is the group's lone entry, at No.306, on Rolling Stone's 500 Greatest Songs of All Time list released in 2004. It consistently makes similar British lists of all-time great songs, such as BBC Radio 2's "Sold on Song" 2004 Top 100, at No.43.

The song uses an almost entirely acoustic arrangement with only very light percussion. Like much of Sound Affects, the song has strong undercurrents of pop-psychedelia. The only electric guitar part in the song is played backwards over one of the verses, a hallmark of psychedelia.

The minimalist, slice-of-life lyrics list various conditions of British working-class life.  The first verse:
A police car and a screaming siren
Pneumatic drill and ripped-up concrete
A baby wailing, stray dog howling
The screech of brakes and lamp light blinking
culminating in the laconic and ironic refrain of "That's entertainment, That's entertainment"

"I was in London by the time I wrote 'That's Entertainment'," said Weller, "writing it was easy in a sense because all those images were at hand, around me." In an interview with Absolute Radio he said: "I wrote it in 10 mins flat, whilst under the influence, I'd had a few but some songs just write themselves. It was easy to write, I drew on everything around me."

Certifications

References

External links
"That's Entertainment" – Song and discussion at BBC
 

The Jam songs
1981 singles
Songs written by Paul Weller
Song recordings produced by Vic Coppersmith-Heaven
1980 songs